Gantillon is a surname. Notable people with the surname include:

Bruno Gantillon (born 1944), French screenwriter and film director
Simon Gantillon (1887–1961), French screenwriter and playwright

Surnames of French origin